The hippocampus (via Latin from Greek , 'seahorse') is a major component of the brain of humans and other vertebrates. Humans and other mammals have two hippocampi, one in each side of the brain. The hippocampus is part of the limbic system, and plays important roles in the consolidation of information from short-term memory to long-term memory, and in spatial memory that enables navigation. The hippocampus is located in the allocortex, with neural projections into the neocortex in humans, as well as primates.  The hippocampus, as the medial pallium, is a structure found in all vertebrates. In humans, it contains two main interlocking parts: the hippocampus proper (also called Ammon's horn), and the dentate gyrus.

In Alzheimer's disease (and other forms of dementia), the hippocampus is one of the first regions of the brain to suffer damage; short-term memory loss and disorientation are included among the early symptoms. Damage to the hippocampus can also result from oxygen starvation (hypoxia), encephalitis, or medial temporal lobe epilepsy. People with extensive, bilateral hippocampal damage may experience anterograde amnesia: the inability to form and retain new memories.

Since different neuronal cell types are neatly organized into layers in the hippocampus, it has frequently been used as a model system for studying neurophysiology. The form of neural plasticity known as long-term potentiation (LTP) was initially discovered to occur in the hippocampus and has often been studied in this structure. LTP is widely believed to be one of the main neural mechanisms by which memories are stored in the brain.

In rodents as model organisms, the hippocampus has been studied extensively as part of a brain system responsible for spatial memory and navigation. Many neurons in the rat and mouse hippocampus respond as place cells: that is, they fire bursts of action potentials when the animal passes through a specific part of its environment. Hippocampal place cells interact extensively with head direction cells, whose activity acts as an inertial compass, and conjecturally with grid cells in the neighboring entorhinal cortex.

Name 

The earliest description of the ridge running along the floor of the temporal horn of the lateral ventricle comes from the Venetian anatomist Julius Caesar Aranzi (1587), who likened it first to a silkworm and then to a seahorse (Latin hippocampus, from Greek ἱππόκαμπος, from ἵππος, 'horse' + κάμπος, 'sea monster'). The German anatomist Duvernoy (1729), the first to illustrate the structure, also wavered between "seahorse" and "silkworm". "Ram's horn" was proposed by the Danish anatomist Jacob Winsløw in 1732; and a decade later his fellow Parisian, the surgeon de Garengeot, used cornu Ammonis – horn of Amun, the ancient Egyptian god who was often represented as having a ram's head.

Another reference appeared with the term pes hippocampi, which may date back to Diemerbroeck in 1672, introducing a comparison with the shape of the folded back forelimbs and webbed feet of the mythological hippocampus, a sea monster with a horse's forequarters and a fish's tail. The hippocampus was then described as pes hippocampi major, with an adjacent bulge in the occipital horn, described as the pes hippocampi minor and later renamed as the calcar avis. The renaming of the hippocampus as hippocampus major, and the calcar avis as hippocampus minor, has been attributed to Félix Vicq-d'Azyr systematizing nomenclature of parts of the brain in 1786. Mayer mistakenly used the term hippopotamus in 1779, and was followed by some other authors until Karl Friedrich Burdach resolved this error in 1829. In 1861 the hippocampus minor became the center of a dispute over human evolution between Thomas Henry Huxley and Richard Owen, satirized as the Great Hippocampus Question. The term hippocampus minor fell from use in anatomy textbooks and was officially removed in the Nomina Anatomica of 1895. Today, the structure is just called the hippocampus, with the term cornu Ammonis (that is, 'Ammon's horn')  surviving in the names of the hippocampal subfields CA1-CA4.

Relation to limbic system
The term limbic system was introduced in 1952 by Paul MacLean to describe the set of structures that line the deep edge of the cortex (Latin limbus meaning border): These include the hippocampus, cingulate cortex, olfactory cortex, and amygdala. Paul MacLean later suggested that the limbic structures comprise the neural basis of emotion. The hippocampus is anatomically connected to parts of the brain that are involved with emotional behaviorthe septum, the hypothalamic mammillary body, and the anterior nuclear complex in the thalamus, and is generally accepted to be part of the limbic system.

Anatomy

The hippocampus can be seen as a ridge of gray matter tissue, elevating from the floor of each lateral ventricle in the region of the inferior or temporal horn. This ridge can also be seen as an inward fold of the archicortex into the medial temporal lobe. The hippocampus can only be seen in dissections as it is concealed by the parahippocampal gyrus. The cortex thins from six layers to the three or four layers that make up the hippocampus.

The term hippocampal formation is used to refer to the hippocampus proper and its related parts. However, there is no consensus as to what parts are included. Sometimes the hippocampus is said to include the dentate gyrus and the subiculum. Some references include the dentate gyrus and the subiculum in the hippocampal formation, and others also include the presubiculum, parasubiculum, and entorhinal cortex. The neural layout and pathways within the hippocampal formation are very similar in all mammals.

The hippocampus, including the dentate gyrus, has the shape of a curved tube, which has been compared to a seahorse, and to a horn of a ram, which after the ancient Egyptian god often portrayed as such takes the name cornu Ammonis. Its abbreviation CA is used in naming the hippocampal subfields CA1, CA2, CA3, and CA4. It can be distinguished as an area where the cortex narrows into a single layer of densely packed pyramidal neurons, which curl into a tight U shape. One edge of the "U," – CA4, is embedded into the backward-facing, flexed dentate gyrus. The hippocampus is described as having an anterior and posterior part (in primates) or a ventral and dorsal part in other animals. Both parts are of similar composition but belong to different neural circuits. In the rat, the two hippocampi resemble a pair of bananas, joined at the stems by the commissure of fornix (also called the hippocampal commissure). In primates, the part of the hippocampus at the bottom, near the base of the temporal lobe, is much broader than the part at the top. This means that in cross-section the hippocampus can show a number of different shapes, depending on the angle and location of the cut.

In a cross-section of the hippocampus, including the dentate gyrus, several layers will be shown. The dentate gyrus has three layers of cells (or four if the hilus is included). The layers are from the outer in – the molecular layer, the inner molecular layer, the granular layer, and the hilus. The CA3 in the hippocampus proper has the following cell layers known as strata: lacunosum-moleculare, radiatum, lucidum, pyramidal, and oriens. CA2 and CA1 also have these layers except the lucidum stratum.

The input to the hippocampus (from varying cortical and subcortical structures) comes from the entorhinal cortex via the perforant path. The entorhinal cortex (EC) is strongly and reciprocally connected with many cortical and subcortical structures as well as with the brainstem. Different thalamic nuclei, (from the anterior and midline groups), the medial septal nucleus, the supramammillary nucleus of the hypothalamus, and the raphe nuclei and locus coeruleus of the brainstem all send axons to the EC, so that it serves as the interface between the neocortex and the other connections, and the hippocampus.

The EC is located in the parahippocampal gyrus, a cortical region adjacent to the hippocampus. This gyrus conceals the hippocampus. The parahippocampal gyrus is adjacent to the perirhinal cortex, which plays an important role in the visual recognition of complex objects. There is also substantial evidence that it makes a contribution to memory, which can be distinguished from the contribution of the hippocampus. It is apparent that complete amnesia occurs only when both the hippocampus and the parahippocampus are damaged.

Circuitry

The major input to the hippocampus is through the entorhinal cortex (EC), whereas its major output is via CA1 to the subiculum. Information reaches CA1 via two main pathways, direct and indirect. Axons from the EC that originate in layer III are the origin of the direct perforant pathway and form synapses on the very distal apical dendrites of CA1 neurons. Conversely, axons originating from layer II are the origin of the indirect pathway, and information reaches CA1 via the trisynaptic circuit. In the initial part of this pathway, the axons project through the perforant pathway to the granule cells of the dentate gyrus (first synapse). From then, the information follows via the mossy fibres to CA3 (second synapse). From there, CA3 axons called Schaffer collaterals leave the deep part of the cell body and loop up to the apical dendrites and then extend to CA1 (third synapse). Axons from CA1 then project back to the entorhinal cortex, completing the circuit.

Basket cells in CA3 receive excitatory input from the pyramidal cells and then give an inhibitory feedback to the pyramidal cells. This recurrent inhibition is a simple feedback circuit that can dampen excitatory responses in the hippocampus. The pyramidal cells gives a recurrent excitation which is an important mechanism found in some memory processing microcircuits.

Several other connections play important roles in hippocampal function. Beyond the output to the EC, additional output pathways go to other cortical areas including the prefrontal cortex. A major output goes via the fornix to the lateral septal area and to the mammillary body of the hypothalamus (which the fornix interconnects with the hippocampus). The hippocampus receives modulatory input from the serotonin, norepinephrine, and dopamine systems, and from the nucleus reuniens of the thalamus to field CA1. A very important projection comes from the medial septal nucleus, which sends cholinergic, and gamma amino butyric acid (GABA) stimulating fibers (GABAergic fibers) to all parts of the hippocampus. The inputs from the medial septal nucleus play a key role in controlling the physiological state of the hippocampus; destruction of this nucleus abolishes the hippocampal theta rhythm and severely impairs certain types of memory.

Regions

Areas of the hippocampus are shown to be functionally and anatomically distinct. The dorsal hippocampus (DH), ventral hippocampus (VH) and intermediate hippocampus serve different functions, project with differing pathways, and have varying degrees of place cells. The dorsal hippocampus serves for spatial memory, verbal memory, and learning of conceptual information. Using the radial arm maze, lesions in the DH were shown to cause spatial memory impairment while VH lesions did not. Its projecting pathways include the medial septal nucleus and supramammillary nucleus. The dorsal hippocampus also has more place cells than both the ventral and intermediate hippocampal regions.

The intermediate hippocampus has overlapping characteristics with both the ventral and dorsal hippocampus. Using anterograde tracing methods, Cenquizca and Swanson (2007) located the moderate projections to two primary olfactory cortical areas and prelimbic areas of the medial prefrontal cortex. This region has the smallest number of place cells. The ventral hippocampus functions in fear conditioning and affective processes. Anagnostaras et al. (2002) showed that alterations to the ventral hippocampus reduced the amount of information sent to the amygdala by the dorsal and ventral hippocampus, consequently altering fear conditioning in rats. Historically, the earliest widely held hypothesis was that the hippocampus is involved in olfaction. This idea was cast into doubt by a series of anatomical studies that did not find any direct projections to the hippocampus from the olfactory bulb. However, later work did confirm that the olfactory bulb does project into the ventral part of the lateral entorhinal cortex, and field CA1 in the ventral hippocampus sends axons to the main olfactory bulb, the anterior olfactory nucleus, and to the primary olfactory cortex. There continues to be some interest in hippocampal olfactory responses, in particular, the role of the hippocampus in memory for odors, but few specialists today believe that olfaction is its primary function.

Function

Theories of hippocampal functions
Over the years, three main ideas of hippocampal function have dominated the literature: response inhibition, episodic memory, and spatial cognition. The behavioral inhibition theory (caricatured by John O'Keefe and Lynn Nadel as "slam on the brakes!") was very popular up to the 1960s. It derived much of its justification from two observations: first, that animals with hippocampal damage tend to be hyperactive; second, that animals with hippocampal damage often have difficulty learning to inhibit responses that they have previously been taught, especially if the response requires remaining quiet as in a passive avoidance test. British psychologist Jeffrey Gray developed this line of thought into a full-fledged theory of the role of the hippocampus in anxiety. The inhibition theory is currently the least popular of the three.

The second major line of thought relates the hippocampus to memory. Although it had historical precursors, this idea derived its main impetus from a famous report by American neurosurgeon William Beecher Scoville and British-Canadian neuropsychologist Brenda Milner describing the results of surgical destruction of the hippocampi when trying to relieve epileptic seizures in an American man Henry Molaison, known until his death in 2008 as "Patient H.M." The unexpected outcome of the surgery was severe anterograde and partial retrograde amnesia; Molaison was unable to form new episodic memories after his surgery and could not remember any events that occurred just before his surgery, but he did retain memories of events that occurred many years earlier extending back into his childhood. This case attracted such widespread professional interest that Molaison became the most intensively studied subject in medical history. In the ensuing years, other patients with similar levels of hippocampal damage and amnesia (caused by accident or disease) have also been studied, and thousands of experiments have studied the physiology of activity-driven changes in synaptic connections in the hippocampus. There is now universal agreement that the hippocampi play some sort of important role in memory; however, the precise nature of this role remains widely debated. A recent theory proposed – without questioning its role in spatial cognition – that the hippocampus encodes new episodic memories by associating representations in the newborn granule cells of the dentate gyrus and arranging those representations sequentially in the CA3 by relying on the phase precession generated in the entorhinal cortex 

The third important theory of hippocampal function relates the hippocampus to space. The spatial theory was originally championed by O'Keefe and Nadel, who were influenced by American psychologist E.C. Tolman's theories about "cognitive maps" in humans and animals. O'Keefe and his student Dostrovsky in 1971 discovered neurons in the rat hippocampus that appeared to them to show activity related to the rat's location within its environment. Despite skepticism from other investigators, O'Keefe and his co-workers, especially Lynn Nadel, continued to investigate this question, in a line of work that eventually led to their very influential 1978 book The Hippocampus as a Cognitive Map. There is now almost universal agreement that hippocampal function plays an important role in spatial coding, but the details are widely debated.

Later research has focused on trying to bridge the disconnect between the two main views of hippocampal function as being split between memory and spatial cognition. In some studies, these areas have been expanded to the point of near convergence. In an attempt to reconcile the two disparate views, it is suggested that a broader view of the hippocampal function is taken and seen to have a role that encompasses both the organisation of experience (mental mapping, as per Tolman's original concept in 1948) and the directional behaviour seen as being involved in all areas of cognition, so that the function of the hippocampus can be viewed as a broader system that incorporates both the memory and the spatial perspectives in its role that involves the use of a wide scope of cognitive maps. This relates to the purposive behaviorism born of Tolman's original goal of identifying the complex cognitive mechanisms and purposes that guided behaviour.

It has also been proposed that the spiking activity of hippocampal neurons is associated spatially, and it was suggested that the mechanisms of memory and planning both evolved from mechanisms of navigation and that their neuronal algorithms were basically the same.

Many studies have made use of neuroimaging techniques such as functional magnetic resonance imaging (fMRI), and a functional role in approach-avoidance conflict has been noted. The anterior hippocampus is seen to be involved in decision-making under approach-avoidance conflict processing. It is suggested that the memory, spatial cognition, and conflict processing functions may be seen as working together and not mutually exclusive.

Role in memory 

Psychologists and neuroscientists generally agree that the hippocampus plays an important role in the formation of new memories about experienced events (episodic or autobiographical memory). Part of this function is hippocampal involvement in the detection of new events, places and stimuli. Some researchers regard the hippocampus as part of a larger medial temporal lobe memory system responsible for general declarative memory (memories that can be explicitly verbalizedthese would include, for example, memory for facts in addition to episodic memory). The hippocampus also encodes emotional context from the amygdala. This is partly why returning to a location where an emotional event occurred may evoke that emotion. There is a deep emotional connection between episodic memories and places.

Due to bilateral symmetry the brain has a hippocampus in each cerebral hemisphere. If damage to the hippocampus occurs in only one hemisphere, leaving the structure intact in the other hemisphere, the brain can retain near-normal memory functioning. Severe damage to the hippocampi in both hemispheres results in profound difficulties in forming new memories (anterograde amnesia) and often also affects memories formed before the damage occurred (retrograde amnesia). Although the retrograde effect normally extends many years back before the brain damage, in some cases older memories remain. This retention of older memories leads to the idea that consolidation over time involves the transfer of memories out of the hippocampus to other parts of the brain. Experiments using intrahippocampal transplantation of hippocampal cells in primates with neurotoxic lesions of the hippocampus have shown that the hippocampus is required for the formation and recall, but not the storage, of memories. It has been shown that a decrease in the volume of various parts of the hippocampus in people leads to specific memory impairments. In particular, efficiency of verbal memory retention is related to the anterior parts of the right and left hippocampus. The right head of the hippocampus is more involved in executive functions and regulation during verbal memory recall. The tail of the left hippocampus tends to be closely related to verbal memory capacity.

Damage to the hippocampus does not affect some types of memory, such as the ability to learn new skills (playing a musical instrument or solving certain types of puzzles, for example). This fact suggests that such abilities depend on different types of memory (procedural memory) and different brain regions. Furthermore, amnesic patients frequently show "implicit" memory for experiences even in the absence of conscious knowledge. For example, patients asked to guess which of two faces they have seen most recently may give the correct answer most of the time in spite of stating that they have never seen either of the faces before. Some researchers distinguish between conscious recollection, which depends on the hippocampus, and familiarity, which depends on portions of the medial temporal lobe.

When rats are exposed to an intense learning event, they may retain a life-long memory of the event even after a single training session. The memory of such an event appears to be first stored in the hippocampus, but this storage is transient. Much of the long-term storage of the memory seems to take place in the anterior cingulate cortex. When such an intense learning event was experimentally applied, more than 5,000 differently methylated DNA regions appeared in the hippocampus neuronal genome of the rats at one hour and at 24 hours after training. These alterations in methylation pattern occurred at many genes that were down-regulated, often due to the formation of new 5-methylcytosine sites in CpG rich regions of the genome. Furthermore, many other genes were upregulated, likely often due to the removal of methyl groups from previously existing 5-methylcytosines (5mCs) in DNA. Demethylation of 5mC can be carried out by several proteins acting in concert, including TET enzymes as well as enzymes of the DNA base excision repair pathway (see Epigenetics in learning and memory).

Role in spatial memory and navigation 

Studies on freely moving rats and mice have shown many hippocampal neurons to act as place cells that cluster in place fields, and these fire bursts of action potentials when the animal passes through a particular location. This place-related neural activity in the hippocampus has also been reported in monkeys that were moved around a room whilst in a restraint chair. However, the place cells may have fired in relation to where the monkey was looking rather than to its actual location in the room. Over many years, many studies have been carried out on place-responses in rodents, which have given a large amount of information. Place cell responses are shown by pyramidal cells in the hippocampus and by granule cells in the dentate gyrus. Other cells in smaller proportion are inhibitory interneurons, and these often show place-related variations in their firing rate that are much weaker. There is little, if any, spatial topography in the representation; in general, cells lying next to each other in the hippocampus have uncorrelated spatial firing patterns. Place cells are typically almost silent when a rat is moving around outside the place field but reach sustained rates as high as 40 Hz when the rat is near the center. Neural activity sampled from 30 to 40 randomly chosen place cells carries enough information to allow a rat's location to be reconstructed with high confidence. The size of place fields varies in a gradient along the length of the hippocampus, with cells at the dorsal end showing the smallest fields, cells near the center showing larger fields, and cells at the ventral tip showing fields that cover the entire environment. In some cases, the firing rate of hippocampal cells depends not only on place but also the direction a rat is moving, the destination toward which it is traveling, or other task-related variables. The firing of place cells is timed in relation to local theta waves, a process termed phase precession.

In humans, cells with location-specific firing patterns have been reported during a study of patients with drug-resistant epilepsy. They were undergoing an invasive procedure to localize the source of their seizures, with a view to surgical resection. The patients had diagnostic electrodes implanted in their hippocampus and then used a computer to move around in a virtual reality town. Similar brain imaging studies in navigation have shown the hippocampus to be active. A study was carried out on taxi drivers. London's black cab drivers need to learn the locations of a large number of places and the fastest routes between them in order to pass a strict test known as The Knowledge in order to gain a license to operate. A study showed that the posterior part of the hippocampus is larger in these drivers than in the general public, and that a positive correlation exists between the length of time served as a driver and the increase in the volume of this part. It was also found the total volume of the hippocampus was unchanged, as the increase seen in the posterior part was made at the expense of the anterior part, which showed a relative decrease in size. There have been no reported adverse effects from this disparity in hippocampal proportions. Another study showed opposite findings in blind individuals. The anterior part of the right hippocampus was larger and the posterior part was smaller, compared with sighted individuals.

There are several navigational cells in the brain that are either in the hippocampus itself or are strongly connected to it, such as the speed cells present in the medial entorhinal cortex. Together these cells form a network that serves as spatial memory. The first of such cells discovered in the 1970s were the place cells, which led to the idea of the hippocampus acting to give a neural representation of the environment in a cognitive map. When the hippocampus is dysfunctional, orientation is affected; people may have difficulty in remembering how they arrived at a location and how to proceed further. Getting lost is a common symptom of amnesia. Studies with animals have shown that an intact hippocampus is required for initial learning and long-term retention of some spatial memory tasks, in particular ones that require finding the way to a hidden goal. Other cells have been discovered since the finding of the place cells in the rodent brain that are either in the hippocampus or the entorhinal cortex. These have been assigned as head direction cells, grid cells and boundary cells. Speed cells are thought to provide input to the hippocampal grid cells.

Role in approach-avoidance conflict processing

Approach-avoidance conflict happens when a situation is presented that can either be rewarding or punishing, and the ensuing decision-making has been associated with anxiety. fMRI findings from studies in approach-avoidance decision-making found evidence for a functional role that is not explained by either long-term memory or spatial cognition. Overall findings showed that the anterior hippocampus is sensitive to conflict, and that it may be part of a larger cortical and subcortical network seen to be important in decision-making in uncertain conditions.

A review makes reference to a number of studies that show the involvement of the hippocampus in conflict tasks. The authors suggest that one challenge is to understand how conflict processing relates to the functions of spatial navigation and memory and how all of these functions need not be mutually exclusive.

Electroencephalography 

The hippocampus shows two major "modes" of activity, each associated with a distinct pattern of neural population activity and waves of electrical activity as measured by an electroencephalogram (EEG). These modes are named after the EEG patterns associated with them: theta and large irregular activity (LIA). The main characteristics described below are for the rat, which is the animal most extensively studied.

The theta mode appears during states of active, alert behavior (especially locomotion), and also during REM (dreaming) sleep. In the theta mode, the EEG is dominated by large regular waves with a frequency range of 6 to 9 Hz, and the main groups of hippocampal neurons (pyramidal cells and granule cells) show sparse population activity, which means that in any short time interval, the great majority of cells are silent, while the small remaining fraction fire at relatively high rates, up to 50 spikes in one second for the most active of them. An active cell typically stays active for half a second to a few seconds. As the rat behaves, the active cells fall silent and new cells become active, but the overall percentage of active cells remains more or less constant. In many situations, cell activity is determined largely by the spatial location of the animal, but other behavioral variables also clearly influence it.

The LIA mode appears during slow-wave (non-dreaming) sleep, and also during states of waking immobility such as resting or eating. In the LIA mode, the EEG is dominated by sharp waves that are randomly timed large deflections of the EEG signal lasting for 25–50 milliseconds. Sharp waves are frequently generated in sets, with sets containing up to 5 or more individual sharp waves and lasting up to 500 ms. The spiking activity of neurons within the hippocampus is highly correlated with sharp wave activity. Most neurons decrease their firing rate between sharp waves; however, during a sharp wave, there is a dramatic increase in firing rate in up to 10% of the hippocampal population

These two hippocampal activity modes can be seen in primates as well as rats, with the exception that it has been difficult to see robust theta rhythmicity in the primate hippocampus. There are, however, qualitatively similar sharp waves and similar state-dependent changes in neural population activity.

Theta rhythm 

The underlying currents producing the theta wave are generated mainly by densely packed neural layers of the entorhinal cortex, CA3, and the dendrites of pyramidal cells. The theta wave is one of the largest signals seen on EEG, and is known as the hippocampal theta rhythm. In some situations the EEG is dominated by regular waves at 3 to 10 Hz, often continuing for many seconds. These reflect subthreshold membrane potentials and strongly modulate the spiking of hippocampal neurons and synchronise across the hippocampus in a travelling wave pattern. The trisynaptic circuit is a relay of neurotransmission in the hippocampus that interacts with many brain regions. From rodent studies it has been proposed that the trisynaptic circuit generates the hippocampal theta rhythm.

Theta rhythmicity is very obvious in rabbits and rodents and also clearly present in cats and dogs. Whether theta can be seen in primates is not yet clear. In rats (the animals that have been the most extensively studied), theta is seen mainly in two conditions: first, when an animal is walking or in some other way actively interacting with its surroundings; second, during REM sleep. The function of theta has not yet been convincingly explained although numerous theories have been proposed. The most popular hypothesis has been to relate it to learning and memory. An example would be the phase with which theta rhythms, at the time of stimulation of a neuron, shape the effect of that stimulation upon its synapses. What is meant here is that theta rhythms may affect those aspects of learning and memory that are dependent upon synaptic plasticity. It is well established that lesions of the medial septumthe central node of the theta systemcause severe disruptions of memory. However, the medial septum is more than just the controller of theta; it is also the main source of cholinergic projections to the hippocampus. It has not been established that septal lesions exert their effects specifically by eliminating the theta rhythm.

Sharp waves 

During sleep or during resting, when an animal is not engaged with its surroundings, the hippocampal EEG shows a pattern of irregular slow waves, somewhat larger in amplitude than theta waves. This pattern is occasionally interrupted by large surges called sharp waves. These events are associated with bursts of spike activity lasting 50 to 100 milliseconds in pyramidal cells of CA3 and CA1. They are also associated with short-lived high-frequency EEG oscillations called "ripples", with frequencies in the range 150 to 200 Hz in rats, and together they are known as sharp waves and ripples. Sharp waves are most frequent during sleep when they occur at an average rate of around 1 per second (in rats) but in a very irregular temporal pattern. Sharp waves are less frequent during inactive waking states and are usually smaller. Sharp waves have also been observed in humans and monkeys. In macaques, sharp waves are robust but do not occur as frequently as in rats.

One of the most interesting aspects of sharp waves is that they appear to be associated with memory. Wilson and McNaughton 1994, and numerous later studies, reported that when hippocampal place cells have overlapping spatial firing fields (and therefore often fire in near-simultaneity), they tend to show correlated activity during sleep following the behavioral session. This enhancement of correlation, commonly known as reactivation, has been found to occur mainly during sharp waves. It has been proposed that sharp waves are, in fact, reactivations of neural activity patterns that were memorized during behavior, driven by strengthening of synaptic connections within the hippocampus. This idea forms a key component of the "two-stage memory" theory, advocated by Buzsáki and others, which proposes that memories are stored within the hippocampus during behavior and then later transferred to the neocortex during sleep. Sharp waves in Hebbian theory are seen as persistently repeated stimulations by presynaptic cells, of postsynaptic cells that are suggested to drive synaptic changes in the cortical targets of hippocampal output pathways. Suppression of sharp waves and ripples in sleep or during immobility can interfere with memories expressed at the level of the behavior, nonetheless, the newly formed CA1 place cell code can re-emerge even after a sleep with abolished sharp waves and ripples, in spatially non-demanding tasks.

Long-term potentiation 

Since at least the time of Ramon y Cajal (1852–1934), psychologists have speculated that the brain stores memory by altering the strength of connections between neurons that are simultaneously active. This idea was formalized by Donald Hebb in 1949, but for many years remained unexplained. In 1973, Tim Bliss and Terje Lømo described a phenomenon in the rabbit hippocampus that appeared to meet Hebb's specifications: a change in synaptic responsiveness induced by brief strong activation and lasting for hours or days or longer. This phenomenon was soon referred to as long-term potentiation (LTP). As a candidate mechanism for long-term memory, LTP has since been studied intensively, and a great deal has been learned about it. However, the complexity and variety of the intracellular signalling cascades that can trigger LTP is acknowledged as preventing a more complete understanding.

The hippocampus is a particularly favorable site for studying LTP because of its densely packed and sharply defined layers of neurons, but similar types of activity-dependent synaptic change have also been observed in many other brain areas. The best-studied form of LTP has been seen in CA1 of the hippocampus and occurs at synapses that terminate on dendritic spines and use the neurotransmitter glutamate. The synaptic changes depend on a special type of glutamate receptor, the N-methyl-D-aspartate (NMDA) receptor, a cell surface receptor which has the special property of allowing calcium to enter the postsynaptic spine only when presynaptic activation and postsynaptic depolarization occur at the same time. Drugs that interfere with NMDA receptors block LTP and have major effects on some types of memory, especially spatial memory. Genetically modified mice that are modified to disable the LTP mechanism, also generally show severe memory deficits.

Disorders

Aging

Age-related conditions such as Alzheimer's disease and other forms of dementia (for which hippocampal disruption is one of the earliest signs) have a severe impact on many types of cognition including memory. Even normal aging is associated with a gradual decline in some types of memory, including episodic memory and working memory (or short-term memory). Because the hippocampus is thought to play a central role in memory, there has been considerable interest in the possibility that age-related declines could be caused by hippocampal deterioration. Some early studies reported substantial loss of neurons in the hippocampus of elderly people, but later studies using more precise techniques found only minimal differences. Similarly, some MRI studies have reported shrinkage of the hippocampus in elderly people, but other studies have failed to reproduce this finding. There is, however, a reliable relationship between the size of the hippocampus and memory performance; so that where there is age-related shrinkage, memory performance will be impaired. There are also reports that memory tasks tend to produce less hippocampal activation in the elderly than in the young. Furthermore, a randomized control trial published in 2011 found that aerobic exercise could increase the size of the hippocampus in adults aged 55 to 80 and also improve spatial memory.

Stress
The hippocampus contains high levels of glucocorticoid receptors, which make it more vulnerable to long-term stress than most other brain areas. There is evidence that humans having experienced severe, long-lasting traumatic stress show atrophy of the hippocampus more than of other parts of the brain. These effects show up in post-traumatic stress disorder, and they may contribute to the hippocampal atrophy reported in schizophrenia and severe depression. Anterior hippocampal volume in children is positively correlated with parental family income and this correlation is thought to be mediated by income related stress. A recent study has also revealed atrophy as a result of depression, but this can be stopped with anti-depressants even if they are not effective in relieving other symptoms.

Chronic stress resulting in elevated levels of glucocorticoids, notably of cortisol, is seen to be a cause of neuronal atrophy in the hippocampus. This atrophy results in a smaller hippocampal volume which is also seen in Cushing's syndrome. The higher levels of cortisol in Cushing's syndrome is usually the result of medications taken for other conditions. Neuronal loss also occurs as a result of impaired neurogenesis. Another factor that contributes to a smaller hippocampal volume is that of dendritic retraction where dendrites are shortened in length and reduced in number, in response to increased glucocorticoids. This dendritic retraction is reversible. After treatment with medication to reduce cortisol in Cushing's syndrome, the hippocampal volume is seen to be restored by as much as 10%. This change is seen to be due to the reforming of the dendrites. This dendritic restoration can also happen when stress is removed. There is, however, evidence derived mainly from studies using rats that stress occurring shortly after birth can affect hippocampal function in ways that persist throughout life.

Sex-specific responses to stress have also been demonstrated in the rat to have an effect on the hippocampus. Chronic stress in the male rat showed dendritic retraction and cell loss in the CA3 region but this was not shown in the female. This was thought to be due to neuroprotective ovarian hormones. In rats, DNA damage increases in the hippocampus under conditions of stress.

Epilepsy

The hippocampus is one of the few brain regions where new neurons are generated. This process of neurogenesis is confined to the dentate gyrus. The production of new neurons can be positively affected by exercise or negatively affected by epileptic seizures.

Seizures in temporal lobe epilepsy can affect the normal development of new neurons and can cause tissue damage. Hippocampal sclerosis including Ammon's horn sclerosis that is specific to the mesial temporal lobe, is the most common type of such tissue damage. It is not yet clear, however, whether the epilepsy is usually caused by hippocampal abnormalities or whether the hippocampus is damaged by cumulative effects of seizures. However, in experimental settings where repetitive seizures are artificially induced in animals, hippocampal damage is a frequent result. This may be a consequence of the concentration of excitable glutamate receptors in the hippocampus. Hyperexcitability can lead to cytotoxicity and cell death. It may also have something to do with the hippocampus being a site where new neurons continue to be created throughout life, and to abnormalities in this process.

Schizophrenia
The causes of schizophrenia are not well understood, but numerous abnormalities of brain structure have been reported. The most thoroughly investigated alterations involve the cerebral cortex, but effects on the hippocampus have also been described. Many reports have found reductions in the size of the hippocampus in people with schizophrenia. The left hippocampus seems to be affected more than the right. The changes noted have largely been accepted to be the result of abnormal development. It is unclear whether hippocampal alterations play any role in causing the psychotic symptoms that are the most important feature of schizophrenia. It has been suggested that on the basis of experimental work using animals, hippocampal dysfunction might produce an alteration of dopamine release in the basal ganglia, thereby indirectly affecting the integration of information in the prefrontal cortex. It has also been suggested that hippocampal dysfunction might account for the disturbances in long-term memory frequently observed.

MRI studies have found a smaller brain volume and larger ventricles in people with schizophreniahowever researchers do not know if the shrinkage is from the schizophrenia or from the medication. The hippocampus and thalamus have been shown to be reduced in volume; and the volume of the globus pallidus is increased. Cortical patterns are altered, and a reduction in the volume and thickness of the cortex particularly in the frontal and temporal lobes has been noted. It has further been proposed that many of the changes seen are present at the start of the disorder which gives weight to the theory that there is abnormal neurodevelopment.

The hippocampus has been seen as central to the pathology of schizophrenia, both in the neural and physiological effects. It has been generally accepted that there is an abnormal synaptic connectivity underlying schizophrenia. Several lines of evidence implicate changes in the synaptic organization and connectivity, in and from the hippocampus Many studies have found dysfunction in the synaptic circuitry within the hippocampus and its activity on the prefrontal cortex. The glutamatergic pathways have been seen to be largely affected. The subfield CA1 is seen to be the least involved of the other subfields, and CA4 and the subiculum have been reported elsewhere as being the most implicated areas. The review concluded that the pathology could be due to genetics, faulty neurodevelopment or abnormal neural plasticity. It was further concluded that schizophrenia is not due to any known neurodegenerative disorder. Oxidative DNA damage is substantially increased in the hippocampus of elderly patients with chronic schizophrenia.

Transient global amnesia

Transient global amnesia is a dramatic, sudden, temporary, near-total loss of short-term memory. Various causes have been hypothesized including ischemia, epilepsy, migraine and disturbance of cerebral venous blood flow, leading to ischemia of structures such as the hippocampus that are involved in memory.

There has been no scientific proof of any cause. However, diffusion weighted MRI studies taken from 12 to 24 hours following an episode has shown there to be small dot-like lesions in the hippocampus. These findings have suggested a possible implication of CA1 neurons made vulnerable by metabolic stress.

PTSD

Some studies shows correlation of reduced hippocampus volume and posttraumatic stress disorder (PTSD). A study of Vietnam War combat veterans with PTSD showed a 20% reduction in the volume of their hippocampus compared with veterans having suffered no such symptoms. This finding was not replicated in chronic PTSD patients traumatized at an air show plane crash in 1988 (Ramstein, Germany). It is also the case that non-combat twin brothers of Vietnam veterans with PTSD also had smaller hippocampi than other controls, raising questions about the nature of the correlation. A 2016 study strengthened theory that a smaller hippocampus increases the risk for post-traumatic stress disorder, and a larger hippocampus increases the likelihood of efficacious treatment.

Microcephaly 

Hippocampus atrophy has been characterized in microcephaly patients and mouse models with WDR62 mutations which recapitulate human point mutations shown a deficiency in hippocampal development and neurogenesis.

Other animals

Other mammals
The hippocampus has a generally similar appearance across the range of mammals, from monotremes such as the echidna to primates such as humans. The hippocampal-size-to-body-size ratio broadly increases, being about twice as large for primates as for the echidna. It does not, however, increase at anywhere close to the rate of the neocortex-to-body-size ratio. Therefore, the hippocampus takes up a much larger fraction of the cortical mantle in rodents than in primates. In adult humans the volume of the hippocampus on each side of the brain is about 3.0 to 3.5 cm3 as compared to 320 to 420 cm3 for the volume of the neocortex.

There is also a general relationship between the size of the hippocampus and spatial memory. When comparisons are made between similar species, those that have a greater capacity for spatial memory tend to have larger hippocampal volumes. This relationship also extends to sex differences; in species where males and females show strong differences in spatial memory ability they also tend to show corresponding differences in hippocampal volume.

Other vertebrates
Non-mammalian species do not have a brain structure that looks like the mammalian hippocampus, but they have one that is considered homologous to it. The hippocampus, as pointed out above, is in essence part of the allocortex. Only mammals have a fully developed cortex, but the structure it evolved from, called the pallium, is present in all vertebrates, even the most primitive ones such as the lamprey or hagfish. The pallium is usually divided into three zones: medial, lateral and dorsal. The medial pallium forms the precursor of the hippocampus. It does not resemble the hippocampus visually because the layers are not warped into an S shape or enfolded by the dentate gyrus, but the homology is indicated by strong chemical and functional affinities. There is now evidence that these hippocampal-like structures are involved in spatial cognition in birds, reptiles, and fish.

Birds
In birds, the correspondence is sufficiently well established that most anatomists refer to the medial pallial zone as the "avian hippocampus". Numerous species of birds have strong spatial skills, in particular those that cache food. There is evidence that food-caching birds have a larger hippocampus than other types of birds and that damage to the hippocampus causes impairments in spatial memory.

Fish
The story for fish is more complex. In teleost fish (which make up the great majority of existing species), the forebrain is distorted in comparison to other types of vertebrates: most neuroanatomists believe that the teleost forebrain is in essence everted, like a sock turned inside-out, so that structures that lie in the interior, next to the ventricles, for most vertebrates, are found on the outside in teleost fish, and vice versa. One of the consequences of this is that the medial pallium ("hippocampal" zone) of a typical vertebrate is thought to correspond to the lateral pallium of a typical fish. Several types of fish (particularly goldfish) have been shown experimentally to have strong spatial memory abilities, even forming "cognitive maps" of the areas they inhabit. There is evidence that damage to the lateral pallium impairs spatial memory. It is not yet known whether the medial pallium plays a similar role in even more primitive vertebrates, such as sharks and rays, or even lampreys and hagfish.

Insects and molluscs
Some types of insects, and molluscs such as the octopus, also have strong spatial learning and navigation abilities, but these appear to work differently from the mammalian spatial system, so there is as yet no good reason to think that they have a common evolutionary origin; nor is there sufficient similarity in brain structure to enable anything resembling a "hippocampus" to be identified in these species. Some have proposed, however, that the insect's mushroom bodies may have a function similar to that of the hippocampus.

Computational models 
Throughout research of hippocampus in different organisms, a comprehensive database about morphology, connectivity, physiology and computational models was collected.

Additional images

Notes

References

Further reading 
Hippocampus (Wiley)

External links 

 
 Diagram of a Hippocampal Brain Slice
 Hippocampus – Cell Centered Database
 Temporal-lobe.com An interactive diagram of the rat parahippocampal-hippocampal region
 Search Hippocampus on BrainNavigator via BrainNavigator

Limbic system